R. S. Templeton was the 13th Surveyor General of Ceylon. He was appointed in 1910, succeeding Philip David Warren, and held the office until 1915. He was succeeded by W. C. S. Ingles.

References

T